Darul uloom, also spelled dar-ul-ulum, is an Arabic term that literally means "house of knowledge". The term generally means an Islamic seminary or educational institution – similar to or often the same as a madrassa or Islamic school – although a darul uloom often indicates a more advanced level of study. In a darul uloom, Islamic subjects are studied by students, who are known as talaba or ṭālib.

Description
The conventional darul ulooms of today have their roots in the Indian subcontinent, where the first darul ulooms were founded by the Indian Islamic scholars (ulema) of the past. Darul ulooms followed in the past, and today continue to follow, the age-old Islamic curriculum known as the Dars-e-Nizami syllabus, which has its origins in the Nizamiyya Islamic schools of the Seljuk Empire, but was developed in the Indian subcontinent under Islamic thinkers and ulema, such as Shah Waliullah Dehlawi (1703 – 1762). The Dars-e-Nizami syllabus comprises studies in tafsir (Qur'anic exegesis), hifz (Qur'anic memorisation), sarf and nahw (Arabic syntax and grammar), Persian, Urdu, tarikh (Islamic history), fiqh (Islamic jurisprudence) and sharia (Islamic law).

List of major darul ulooms

Dar Al Uloom University, university in Saudi Arabia
Faculty of Dar Al Uloom Cairo University
Dar-ul-Uloom, Karachi, Islamic education university (Madrasa) in Karachi, Pakistan (established in 1951)
Darul Uloom Haqqania, Akora Khattak, Khyber Pakhtunkhwa, Pakistan
Jamiah Arabia Ahsan-Ul-Uloom, Karachi, Pakistan
Jamia Uloom ul Islamia, Karachi, Pakistan
 Jamia Madania Baridhara, Dhaka, Bangladesh
Al-Jamiatul Ahlia Darul Ulum Moinul Islam, Hathazari, Bangladesh
Darul Uloom Deoband, Deoband, Uttar Pradesh, India (where the Deobandi Islamic movement was started in 1868)
Darul-uloom Nadwatul Ulama (established 1894), Lucknow, India
Jamiah Darul Uloom Zahedan, Zahedan, Iran
Darul Uloom Zakariyya, Lenasia, South Africa
Darul Uloom CTIEC, Cape Town, South Africa
Darul Uloom Birmingham, Birmingham, England
Darul Uloom Bury, Greater Manchester, England
Darul Uloom London, London, England
Darul Uloom Bolton, Bolton, England
Darul Uloom Al-Madania, Buffalo, New York
Masjid Darussalam, Lombard, United States
 Darul Uloom New Jersey, Paterson, New Jersey, United States
 Darul Uloom Central Jersey (CJIIS), New Jersey, United States
 Darul Uloom New York, Queens, New York, United States
 Darul Uloom Seattle, United States 
 Dārul ‘Ulūm Hamīdiyyah, Piscataway, New Jersey

See also
List of Islamic seminaries

References

Islam in India
Islam in Pakistan
Islamic seminaries and theological colleges
School types
Deobandi Islamic universities and colleges
Islamic terminology